The 1987–88 Maryland Terrapins men's basketball team represented the University of Maryland, College Park as a member of the Atlantic Coast Conference during the 1987–88 NCAA Division I men's basketball season. The team was led by second-year head coach Bob Wade and played their home games at Cole Field House.

Roster

Schedule and results

|-
!colspan=9 style=| Regular season

|-
!colspan=9 style=|

|-
!colspan=9 style=|

Rankings

Team players in the 1988 NBA draft

References

Maryland Terrapins men's basketball seasons
Maryland
Maryland
Maryland
Maryland